The 2013–14 season will be the 42nd season in Real Madrid Castilla's history (since its establishment in 1972) and their 2nd consecutive season (22nd overall) in the Segunda División, the second division of Spanish football. It covers a period from 1 July 2013 to 30 June 2014.

Season overview

Pre-season
Real Madrid Castilla started the summer with key players leaving the team. On 10 June, Real Madrid announced the signing of former loanee Casemiro from São Paulo for €6 million.

On 13 June, Juanfran signed with Real Betis on a free transfer.

On 30 June, loanees Pedro Mosquera, Jota and Fabinho were returned to Getafe, Celta de Vigo and Rio Ave respectively.

On 5 July, José Antonio Ríos signed with Mirandés on a free transfer.

On 10 July, Real Madrid agreed a four-year contract extension with Nacho.

On 18 July, Real Madrid Castilla announced its first signing of the season in Jorge Pulido from Atlético Madrid.

On 24 July, Real Madrid agreed a four-year contract extension with Jesé.
 
On 25 July, Real Madrid agreed a four-year contract extension with Denis Cheryshev.

On 27 July, Real Madrid Castilla received Jaime Romero from Udinese on loan.

Players

Squad information

In

Out

Pre-season and friendlies

Last updated: 9 August 2013
Sources:

Matches

References

Real Madrid Castilla seasons
Real Madrid Castilla